The Colton Hills are a low mountain range in the eastern Mojave Desert, protected within Mojave National Preserve, in Southern California.

They are located in northeastern San Bernardino County.

References 

Mountain ranges of the Mojave Desert
Mojave National Preserve
Mountain ranges of San Bernardino County, California
Hills of California
Mountain ranges of Southern California